Vafs (also known as Vabs and Waūs) is a village in Esfandan Rural District, in the Central District of Komijan County, Markazi Province, Iran. At the 2006 census, its population was 1,607, in 509 families. The inhabitants belong to the Tat ethnic group and they speak Tati language.

References 

Populated places in Komijan County